"That's My Life (My Love and My Home)" is a 1965 single by Alfred "Freddie" Lennon, the father of the musician John Lennon of the Beatles.

Background
Tony Cartwright, co-author of the song, began writing it with inspiration from Freddie Lennon's stories. It was recorded by a 30 piece orchestra which included the future members of the Jimi Hendrix Experience, Mitch Mitchell and Noel Redding. When released, the song had commercial success, with Morris Levy of Roulette Records asking Cartwright to bring Lennon to the United States. However, the song suddenly disappeared from the charts, an action suspected by Cartwright to be instigated by John Lennon. Alfred, disheartened, abandoned further attempts at a career in music.

Track listing
All songs composed by Freddie Lennon and Tony Cartwright.

References

1965 singles
John Lennon
Song recordings produced by John Schroeder (musician)
Piccadilly Records singles